Arusha may refer to:

 Arusha (ethnic group), an ethnic group in northern Tanzania
 Arusha, a city in northern Tanzania
 Arusha Region, the region of Tanzania that is home to the Arusha people and the city of Arusha
 Arusha District, a district of Arusha Region, which includes the city of Arusha
 Arusha Declaration, a 1967 declaration calling for African socialism and other reforms
 Arusha Agreement, a 1969 agreement with the European Communities
 Arusha Accords (Rwanda), a 1993 set of accords intended to end the civil war in Rwanda
 Arusha Accords (Burundi), a 2000 set of accords intended to end the civil war in Burundi
 Arusha National Park